Stormwitch is a German heavy metal band from Heidenheim, Baden Württemberg, Germany, formed in 1981. They have been called "The Masters of Black Romantic" by their fans. The band's song lyrics often focused on fantasy, occult or historical themes, along with their contemporaries and countrymen Helloween. They performed at Wacken Open Air festival in 2002. Over time, they have changed their sound from a Judas Priest-esque style of heavy metal to a more keyboard based form of power metal.

History
Stormwitch was founded in the early 1980s by childhood friends Harald Spengler (Lee Tarot), Stefan Kauffmann (Steve Merchant), and Andy Mück, writing their first songs while they searched for the final pieces of the band to play live shows, including clubs and youth centers. The first line-up was completed by Peter Langer (Pete Lancer) and Jürgen Wannenwetsch.

Their first album, Walpurgis Night, in 1984, was recorded using as little post-production as possible to remain true to the sound they were trying to achieve. They did not use multi-track recording, instead recording the album straight through. Approximately a year later they recorded the album Tales of Terror, of which the master tapes were supposed to be destroyed, only recently being re-recorded using original LP albums.
Their third album Stronger Than Heaven was released in 1986, followed by The Beauty and the Beast in 1987. In 1989,  they released Eye of the Storm and Live in Budapest. They toured much of Europe during the Cold War, including Eastern European countries such as Hungary, where they were waylaid by officials and nearly missed the first gig of that particular tour.

Shortly after, Harald Spengler left the band to concentrate on managing. In 1992, Stefan Kauffmann and Wolfgang Schludi (who replaced Harald Spengler) also left the band before the recordings for War of the Wizards could start. The recording line-up for War of the Wizards consisted of Andy Mück (Vocals), Damir Uzunovic (Guitar), Joe Gassmann (Guitar), Martin Albrecht (Bass) and Peter Langer (Drums). After the release, Joe Gassmann had to leave the band. As a four-piece they recorded "Shogun" in 1994.

After some changes in line up once again and an eventual break up in 1996, Andy Mück, the only member from the original line-up, and Martin Winkler wrote the song Dance with the Witches in 2002, and with a new line up and the help of Nuclear Blast Records, Stormwitch regrouped once more and took to the stage.

This new line-up also released the album Witchcraft in 2004 but split up shortly after. Again Andy Mück was the original member. He regrouped with first bass-player Jürgen Wannenwetsch in 2005. In 2010 the line-up was completed once again with Ralf Spitznagel (Guitar), Marc Scheunert (Guitar) and Harry Reischmann (Drums). Reischmann's departure was announced in January 2011, with Stefan Köllner being brought in to replace him on drums. The band have commented on their website that a new album is in progress and should be released in 2011. It will be titled Season of the Witch.
On April 11, 2013 Original Guitarist Lee Tarot died of a stroke at the age of 50 
In April 2013 Guitarist Marc Scheunert left the band due to problems caused by the age gap between himself and the other members of the band.

Discography
Stormwitch formed in the 1980s and released seven albums in their original spell:
 Walpurgis Night (1984)
 Tales of Terror (1985)
 Stronger Than Heaven (1986)
 The Beauty and the Beast (1988)
 Live in Budapest (1989)
 Eye of the Storm (1989)
 War of the Wizards (1992)
 Shogun (1994)
 Dance with the Witches (2002)
 Witchcraft (2004)
 Season of the Witch (2015)
 Bound to the Witch (2018)

Members

Current
 Andy Mück – Vocals (1981–1994, 2002–2004, 2010–present)
 Pietro Raneri – Bass (2019-present) 
 Alex Sauer – Drums (2019-present)

Former
Guitar
 Steve Merchant (1981–1989)
 Lee Tarot (1981–1989; died 2013)
 Damir Uzunovic (1990–1994)
 Joe Gassmann (1990–1992)
 Robert Balci (1992–1994)
 Martin Winkler (2002–2004; died 2019)
 Fabian Schwarz (2002–2004)
 Marc Scheunert (2010–2013)
 Volker Schmietow (2013–2019)
 Tobias Kipp (2016–2019)
 Nick Berger – Guitars (2019-2020)
 Johnny Kröner – Guitars (2019-2020)

Bass
 Ronny Pearson (1983–1987)
 Andy Hunter (1987–1989)
 Martin Albrecht (1990–1994)
 Dominik Schwarz (2002–2004)
 Jürgen Wannenwetsch (1981–1983, 2010–2019)

Drums
 Peter Lancer (1981–1994, 2012–2014)
 Michael Blechinger (2004–2005)
 Harry Reischmann (2010–2011)
 Micha Kasper (2014–2015)
 Marc Oppold (2002–2004, 2016–2019)

Timeline

References

External links
 Official Stormwitch website
 Stormwitch on Nightfall in Metal Earth
 In-depth information on Stormwitch

German heavy metal musical groups
Musical groups established in 1981
Nuclear Blast artists
1981 establishments in Germany